Khalid Nizami is a Pakistani comedian actor and music composer. He is primarily known for playing a comedy role in Haseena Moin's play Ankahi. He has played several comedy characters in  PTV dramas since 1970. He composed a song "Tum Sung Nainan Laagay" which was sung by Rubina Badar and became a classic hit. He also composed some songs for the singer A. Nayyar. 

Nizami also acted in Haseena Moin'''s plays Eid Ka Jorra and Shehzori (1974). He appeared in some Urdu films, including Haqeeqat (1974), which was directed by Nazar-ul-Islam.

TV plays
 Uncle Urfi (1972)
 Shehzori (1974)
 Ankahi (1982)
 Hum Chale Aaye (2008)

Films
 Haqeeqat (1974)
 Pehchan (1975)

Songs
 Tum sung Nainan Laagay'' — Singer: Rubina Badar, Poet: Asad Muhammad Khan

References

Year of birth missing (living people)
Pakistani comedians
Pakistani musicians